Idyl or idyll or variation, may refer to:

 Idyll or idyl, a type of poem
 Lake Idyl, Winter Haven, Florida, USA; a lake
 Idyll Farms, Northport, Michigan, USA; a goat farm
 Idyl (musician), Nigerian singer Daniel Diongoli
 Idylls (album), 1992 album by Love Spirals Downwards

See also

 
 
 
 Idyll XI (bucolic poem #11) by Theocritus
 Idyll VI (bucolic poem #6) by Theocritus
 Idyllic school (The Idyllists), 19th century British art movement
 Ideal (disambiguation)
 Idol (disambiguation)
 Idle (disambiguation)